In architecture and structural engineering, a space frame or space structure (3D truss) is a rigid, lightweight, truss-like structure constructed from interlocking struts in a geometric pattern. Space frames can be used to span large areas with few interior supports.  Like the truss, a space frame is strong because of the inherent rigidity of the triangle; flexing loads (bending moments) are transmitted as tension and compression loads along the length of each strut.

History
Alexander Graham Bell from 1898 to 1908 developed space frames based on tetrahedral geometry. Bell's interest was primarily in using them to make rigid frames for nautical and aeronautical engineering, with the tetrahedral truss being one of his inventions. Max Mengeringhausen developed the space grid system called MERO (acronym of MEngeringhausen ROhrbauweise) in 1943 in Germany, thus initiating the use of space trusses in architecture. The commonly used method, still in use has individual tubular members connected at node joints (ball shaped) and variations such as the space deck system, octet truss system and cubic system. Stéphane de Chateau in France invented the Tridirectional SDC system (1957), Unibat system (1959), Pyramitec (1960). A method of tree supports was developed to replace the individual columns. Buckminster Fuller patented the octet truss in 1961 while focusing on architectural structures.

Design methods
Space frames are typically designed using a rigidity matrix. The special characteristic of the stiffness matrix in an architectural space frame is the independence of the angular factors.  If the joints are sufficiently rigid, the angular deflections can be neglected, simplifying the calculations.

Overview

The simplest form of space frame is a horizontal slab of interlocking square pyramids and tetrahedra built from Aluminium or tubular steel struts. In many ways this looks like the horizontal jib of a tower crane repeated many times to make it wider.  A stronger form is composed of interlocking tetrahedra in which all the struts have unit length. More technically this is referred to as an isotropic vector matrix or in a single unit width an octet truss. More complex variations change the lengths of the struts to curve the overall structure or may incorporate other geometrical shapes.

Types
Within the meaning of space frame, we can find three systems clearly different between them:

Curvature classification

 Space plane covers: These spatial structures are composed of planar substructures. Their behavior is similar to that of a plate in which the deflections in the plane are channeled through the horizontal bars and the shear forces are supported by the diagonals.

 Barrel vaults: This type of vault has a cross section of a simple arch. Usually this type of space frame does not need to use tetrahedral modules or pyramids as a part of its backing. The section type barrel vault is organized according to IS: 800-2007, and the evaluation is carried out mostly using STAAD. This work elicit evaluations of models for range, extreme redirection, self-weight, and cost.
 Spherical domes and other compound curves usually require the use of tetrahedral modules or pyramids and additional support from a skin.

Classification by the arrangement of its elements

 Single layer grid: All elements are located on the surface to be approximated.
 Double layer grid: Elements are organized in two layers parallel to each other at a certain distance apart. Each of the layers form a lattice of triangles, squares or hexagons in which the projection of the nodes in a layer may overlap or be displaced relative to each other. Diagonal bars connect the nodes of both layers in different directions in space. In this type of meshes, the elements are associated into three groups: upper cordon, cordon and cordon lower diagonal.
 Triple layer grid: Elements are placed in three parallel layers, linked by the diagonals. They are almost always flat.

Other examples classifiable as space frames are these:

 Pleated metallic structures: Emerged to try to solve the problems that formwork and pouring concrete had their counterparts. Typically run with welded joint, but may raise prefabricated joints, a fact which makes them space meshes.
 Hanging covers: Designs on the cable taut, spine, and the catenary arch anti-funicular show their ability to channel forces theoretically better than any other alternative, have an infinite range of possibilities for composition and adaptability to any type of plant cover or ensure vain. However, imprecisions in shape having the loaded strand (ideally adapts dynamically to the state of charge) and the risk of bending the arc to unexpected stresses are problems that require pre-compression and pre-stressing elements. Although in most cases tend to be the cheapest and the technical solution that best fits the acoustics and ventilation of the covered enclosure, are vulnerable to vibration.
 Pneumatic structures: Closure membranes subjected to a pressurized state may be considered within this group.

Applications
 Industrial buildings, factories
 Sports halls
 Warehouses
 Swimming pools
 Conference halls and exhibition centers
 Stadiums with long span distance
 Museum and fair houses
 Shopping centers and malls
 Airports and canopy
 Atrium

Construction
Space frames are a common feature in modern building construction; they are often found in large roof spans in modernist commercial and industrial buildings.

Examples of buildings based on space frames include:
 Stansted Airport, by Foster + Partners
 Bank of China Tower and the Louvre Pyramid, by I. M. Pei
 Rogers Centre by Rod Robbie and Michael Allan
 McCormick Place East in Chicago
Arena das Dunas in Natal, Brazil by Populous
 Eden Project in Cornwall, England
 Globen, Sweden - Dome with diameter of 110 m, (1989)
 Biosphere 2 by John P. Allen, Phil Hawes, Peter Jon Pearce in Oracle, Arizona
 Jacob K. Javits Convention Center, New York City, New York
Palau Sant Jordi in Barcelona, Spain by Arata Isozaki
 Sochi International Airport in Sochi, Russia
 Entrance to Six Flags Magic Mountain
 Taiwan Taoyuan International Airport airport terminal 2
 Harbin Opera House in China by Ma Yansong
 Hedyar Aliyev Centre in Azerbaijan by Zaha Hadid 

Large portable stages and lighting gantries are also frequently built from space frames and octet trusses.

Vehicles

Aircraft 
The CAC CA-6 Wackett and Yeoman YA-1 Cropmaster 250R aircraft were built using roughly the same welded steel tube fuselage frame.

Cars 
Space frames are sometimes used in the chassis designs of automobiles and motorcycles. In both a space frame and a tube-frame chassis, the suspension, engine, and body panels are attached to a skeletal frame of tubes, and the body panels have little or no structural function. By contrast, in a unibody or monocoque design, the body serves as part of the structure.

Tube-frame chassis pre-date space frame chassis and are a development of the earlier ladder chassis. The advantage of using tubes rather than the previous open channel sections is that they resist torsional forces better. Some tube chassis were little more than a ladder chassis made with two large diameter tubes, or even a single tube as a backbone chassis. Although many tubular chassis developed additional tubes and were even described as "space frames", their design was rarely correctly stressed as a space frame and they behaved mechanically as a tube ladder chassis, with additional brackets to support the attached components, suspension, engine etc. The distinction of the true space frame is that all the forces in each strut are either tensile or compression, never bending. Although these additional tubes did carry some extra load, they were rarely diagonalised into a rigid space frame.

An earlier contender for the first true space frame chassis is the one off Chamberlain 8 race "special"  built by brothers Bob and Bill Chamberlain in Melbourne, Australia in 1929. Others attribute vehicles produced in the 1930s by designers such as Buckminster Fuller and William Bushnell Stout (the Dymaxion and the Stout Scarab) who understood the theory of the true space frame from either architecture or aircraft design.

A post WW2 attempt to build a racing car space frame was the Cisitalia D46 of 1946. This used two small diameter tubes along each side, but they were spaced apart by vertical smaller tubes, and so were not diagonalised in any plane. A year later, Porsche designed their Type 360 for Cisitalia. As this included diagonal tubes, it can be considered a true space frame and arguable the first mid-rear engined design.

The Maserati Tipo 61 of 1959 (Birdcage) is often thought of as the first but in 1949 Robert Eberan von Eberhorst designed the Jowett Jupiter exhibited at that year's London Motor Show; the Jowett went on to take a class win at the 1950 Le Mans 24hr. Later, TVR, the small British car manufacturers developed the concept and produced an alloy-bodied two seater on a multi tubular chassis, which appeared in 1949.

Colin Chapman of Lotus introduced his first 'production' car, the Mark VI, in 1952. This was influenced by the Jaguar C-Type chassis, another with four tubes of two different diameters, separated by narrower tubes. Chapman reduced the main tube diameter for the lighter Lotus, but did not reduce the minor tubes any further, possibly because he considered that this would appear flimsy to buyers. Although widely described as a space frame, Lotus did not build a true space frame chassis until the Mark VIII, with the influence of other designers, with experience from the aircraft industry.

A large number of kit cars, possibly the majority made in the UK, use space frame construction, because manufacture in small quantity requires only simple and inexpensive jigs, and it is relatively easy for an amateur designer to achieve good stiffness with a space frame. Generally the space frames are MIG welded, although the more expensive kits often use TIG welding, a slower and more highly skilled process. Many of these resemble the Lotus Seven in general outline and mechanical layout, however others are close replicas of the AC Cobra or Italian supercars, but some are original designs resembling no other vehicle. Often, considerable effort has been made by the designers to produce true space frames, with all points of significant load braced in 3 dimensions, resulting in strength and stiffness comparable to, or better than, typical production cars. Others are tube frames but not true space frames because they use relatively large diameter tubes, often curved, which are carrying bending loads, but due to the large diameter remain adequately rigid. However some inferior designs are not true space frames, because the tubes are carrying considerable bending loads.  This will result in considerable flexing due to dynamic loads, and ultimately fatigue fracture, a failure mechanism which is rare in a correctly designed true space frame. The reduced stiffness will also impair the handling.

A drawback of the space frame chassis is that it encloses much of the working volume of the car and can make access for both the driver and to the engine difficult. Some space frames have been designed with removable sections, joined by bolted pin joints. Such a structure had already been used around the engine of the Lotus Mark III.  Although somewhat inconvenient, an advantage of the space frame is that the same lack of bending forces in the tubes that allow it to be modelled as a pin-jointed structure also means that such a removable section need not reduce the strength of the assembled frame.

Motorcycles and bicycles 
Italian motorbike manufacturer Ducati extensively uses tube frame chassis on its models.

Space frames have also been used in bicycles, such as those designed by Alex Moulton.

See also
Backbone chassis
Body-on-frame
Framing (construction)
Monocoque
Modular construction systems
Platonic solids
Stressed skin construction
Superleggera
Tensegrity
Tessellated roof
Tetrahedral-octahedral honeycomb

References

Structural system
Structural engineering